When customers of a public switched telephone network make telephone calls, they utilize a telecommunications network called a switched-circuit network. In a switched-circuit network, devices known as switches are used to connect the calling party to the called party. Each switch has a number of inlets and outlets, and by connecting a specific inlet to the correct outlet, each switch helps to complete an end-to-end circuit between users. This method is used in, for example graded multiple banks of selectors.

In a modern circuit-switched network, switches can connect any inlet to any outlet; this is known as full availability.

References

 Kennedy I., Lost Call Theory, Lecture Notes, ELEN5007: Teletraffic Engineering, School of Electrical and Information Engineering, University of the Witwatersrand, 2005.
 Akimaru H., Kawashima K., Teletraffic: Theory and Applications, Springer-Verlag London, 2nd Ed., 1999, p 6.
 Farr R.E., Telecommunications Traffic, Tariffs and Costs: An Introduction For Managers, Peter Peregrinus, 1988, p 90.

Notes 

Telephone exchanges